Kirad al-Baqqara was a Palestinian Arab village in the Safad Subdistrict. It was depopulated during the 1947–1948 Civil War in Mandatory Palestine on April 22, 1948, by the Palmach's First Battalion of Operation Yiftach. It was located 11 km northwest of Safad and Wadi Mushayrifa ran between the two Kirad villages (al-Ghannama and al-Baqqara).

History

British Mandate era 
In the British Mandate period, in  the 1931 census Arab al-Baqqara had a population of  245 Muslims, in 34  houses.

By the 1945 statistics the population was  360 Muslims,  with a total of 2,262 dunams of land, according to an official land and population survey. Of this, a total of 1,961 dunums were used for cereals; 60 dunums were irrigated or used for plantations,  while a  120 dunams were non-cultivable  area.

1948, aftermath 

In April 1948, large part of the population left the village after full-scale hostilities broke out.

After the 1948 Palestine war, according to the armistice agreements of 1949 Between Israel and Syria, it was determined that a string of villages, including Al-Nuqayb Al-Hamma, Al-Samra in the Tiberias Subdistrict and Kirad al-Baqqara and Kirad al-Ghannama further north in Safad Subdistrict, would be included the demilitarized zone (DMZ) between Israel and Syria. The villagers and  their property were formally protected by Article V  of the Israeli-Syrian agreement of 20 July that year. However,  Israel thought the villagers could pose a security threat, and Israeli settlers and settlement agencies coveted the land. Israel therefore wanted the Palestinian inhabitants, a total of 2,200 villagers,  moved to Syria.

In the spring of 1951, Israel decided to assert its sovereignty over the DMZ, including "the transfer of Arab civilians from the area.." On the night of the 30 March they  forcibly transferred all the 800 inhabitants of Kirad al-Ghannama  and Kirad al-Baqqara to Sha'ab.

A United Nations decision allowed the villagers to return, however, Israel pressured them to remain in Sha'ab. In spite of this, many of the villagers returned to their homes in the DMZ. In  1956 Israel expelled the two Khirad-villages again,  and this time the sites were physically destroyed and ploughed over. Most of the villagers went to Syria, a few went back to  Sha'ab.

References

Bibliography

 (p.115-18. Cited in Morris, 1993, p. 362)
 

 

 (pp. 132, 539)

External links
Welcome To Kirad al-Baqqara
Kirad al-Baqqara, Zochrot
Kirad al-Baqqara  at Khalil Sakakini Cultural Center

Arab villages depopulated during the 1948 Arab–Israeli War
District of Safad